Mount Beulah is a  mountain summit located in Summit County, Utah, United States.

Description
Mount Beulah is set within the High Uintas Wilderness on land managed by Uinta-Wasatch-Cache National Forest. It is situated in the Uinta Mountains which are a subset of the Rocky Mountains, and it ranks as the 55th-highest summit in Utah. Neighbors include The Cathedral two miles to the southwest, Yard Peak 3.3 miles to the south-southwest, and Dead Horse Peak is 3.5 miles to the south. Precipitation runoff from the mountain's west slope drains to the Bear River, whereas the east slope drains to the Blacks Fork. This mountain's toponym has been officially adopted by the United States Board on Geographic Names.

Climate
Based on the Köppen climate classification, Mount Beulah is located in a subarctic climate zone with cold snowy winters and mild summers. Tundra climate characterizes the summit and highest slopes.

See also
 Geology of the Uinta Mountains

References

External links
 Mount Beulah (photo): Flickr.com
 Mount Beulah rock climbing: Mountainproject.com

Mountains of Utah
Features of the Uinta Mountains
Mountains of Summit County, Utah
North American 3000 m summits
Wasatch-Cache National Forest